Asterionellopsis is a genus of diatoms belonging to the family Asterionellopsidaceae.

Species:

Asterionellopsis glacialis 
Asterionellopsis guyunusae 
Asterionellopsis kariana 
Asterionellopsis lenisilicea 
Asterionellopsis maritima 
Asterionellopsis socialis 
Asterionellopsis thurstonii 
Asterionellopsis tropicalis

References

Diatoms
Diatom genera